Extraterrestrial is a 2011 Spanish science-fiction romantic comedy written and directed by Nacho Vigalondo and starring Michelle Jenner, Julián Villagrán and Carlos Areces. It was filmed in Cantabria in northern Spain and premiered in Spain on March 23, 2012. The film was shown worldwide: at the Toronto International Film Festival, the International Film Festival of San Sebastián, the Sitges Film Festival in Sitges, Spain, and the Fantastic Fest in Austin, Texas.

Synopsis
Julio (Julián Villagrán) wakes up one morning in an apartment, unable to remember what happened the night before.  He barely has a chance to speak to the girl he spent the previous evening with, Julia (Michelle Jenner), when it becomes clear there is an alien spacecraft hanging over the city.

Before long they discover that the next-door neighbor Ángel (Carlos Areces) and Julia's boyfriend Carlos (Raúl Cimas) are both alive.

Cast
Michelle Jenner as Julia
Carlos Areces as Ángel
Julián Villagrán as Julio
Raúl Cimas as Carlos
Miguel Noguera as TV presenter

Reception

References

External links

2011 films
2010s science fiction comedy-drama films
2010s romantic comedy-drama films
Films set in Spain
Films shot in Spain
2010s Spanish-language films
Spanish science fiction comedy-drama films
Spanish romantic comedy-drama films
Films directed by Nacho Vigalondo
Alien invasions in films
2011 comedy-drama films
2010s Spanish films